Amino acids are listed by type:
 Proteinogenic amino acid
 Non-proteinogenic amino acids